The 2020 season was Lightning's first season, in which they competed in the 50 over Rachael Heyhoe Flint Trophy following reforms to the structure of women's domestic cricket in England. The side finished bottom of the North Group of the competition, winning two of their six matches.

After the ending of the Women's Cricket Super League in 2019, the ECB announced the beginning of a new "women's elite domestic structure". Eight teams were included in this new structure, with Lightning being one of the new teams, replacing Loughborough Lightning and representing the East Midlands. Due to the impact of the COVID-19 pandemic, only the Rachael Heyhoe Flint Trophy was able to take place. Lightning were captained by Kathryn Bryce and coached by Rob Taylor. They played their home matches at Trent Bridge and Grace Road.

Squad
Lightning announced their squad on 20 August 2020. Age given is at the start of Lightning's first match of the season (29 August 2020).

Rachael Heyhoe Flint Trophy

North Group

Fixtures

Statistics

Batting

Bowling

Fielding

Wicket-keeping

References

The Blaze (women's cricket) seasons
2020 in English women's cricket